Kyaw Kyaw Win (born 10 December 1978) is a Burmese politician and lawyer who currently serves as a House of Nationalities member of parliament for Rakhine State No. 8 constituency. He is a member of the Arakan National Party.

Early life and education 
Kyaw Kyaw Win born on 10 December 1978 in Pauktaw Township, Rakhine State, Myanmar. He graduated with B.A (L.L.B) from distance education at Sittwe University. He worked Senior lawyer in the Maungdaw Township.

Political career
He is a member of the Arakan National Party, he was elected as an Amyotha Hluttaw MP and elected representative from Arakan No. 8 parliamentary constituency.

References

1978 births
Living people
Members of the House of Nationalities
Arakan National Party politicians
People from Rakhine State
21st-century Burmese lawyers
Arakanese politicians